Characiopsidaceae is a family of algae belonging to the order Mischococcales.

Selected genera:
 Characidiopsis Pascher
 Characiopsis Borzì   
 Chlorothecium Borzì

References

Xanthophyceae
Heterokont families